Kamil Damašek (born September 22, 1973 in Žatec, Czechoslovakia) is a retired male decathlete from the Czech Republic, who competed for his native country at the 1996 Summer Olympics in Atlanta, Georgia. A member of Dukla Prague he set his personal best score (8256 points) in the men's decathlon in 1996.

Achievements

References

sports-reference

1973 births
Living people
Czech decathletes
Athletes (track and field) at the 1996 Summer Olympics
Olympic athletes of the Czech Republic
Universiade medalists in athletics (track and field)
Universiade silver medalists for the Czech Republic
Medalists at the 1997 Summer Universiade